Oostwold may refer to:

 Oostwold, Leek, a village in the municipality of Leek, province of Groningen in the Netherlands
 Oostwold, Oldambt, a village in the municipality of Oldambt, province of Groningen in the Netherlands
 Oostwold Airport, near Winschoten, province of Groningen in the Netherlands